Jatindra Nath Duwara (1892-1964) was a notable poet of the Jonaki era of Assamese literature. Duwara is known as Bonphulor kobi in the Assamese literacy society. He was the first writer awarded with Sahitya Akademi Award in 1955 for his poetry book "Bon Phul". He was the president of the Assam Sahitya Sabha, the premier literary organization of Assam in 1955 which was held at Guwahati.

Short Biography
Duwara was born in Rangpur at Sivasagar district on 4 March 1892 to Shyamsundor Duwara and Punoyda Duwara. He had his early schooling at Sivasagar and then went to Calcutta for higher education. Duwara spent his whole life as unmarried. He died on 5 July 1964.

Literary works
Some of his literary works include:
 Umor Titho (ওমৰ তীৰ্থ) - 1925
 Kotha Kobita (কথা কবিতা) - 1933
 Apun Sur (আপোন সুৰ) - 1938
 Bonphul (বনফুল) - 1952
 Milonor Soor (মিলনৰ সুৰ) - 1960
 Moromor Soor ( মৰমৰ সুৰ)

See also
 Assamese literature
 List of people from Assam
 List of Asam Sahitya Sabha Presidents
 List of Assamese writers with their pen names
 List of Sahitya Akademi Award winners for Assamese

References

External links
 যতীন্দ্ৰনাথ দুৱৰাৰ 'বনফুল' at assameseonline.com . 
 অতীতক যোৱাঁহে পাহৰি  – a poem by Jatindra Nath Duwara at xophura.net .

1892 births
Assamese-language poets
Asom Sahitya Sabha Presidents
1964 deaths
Recipients of the Sahitya Akademi Award in Assamese
People from Sivasagar district
20th-century Indian poets
Indian male poets
Poets from Assam
20th-century Indian male writers